Samuel Keeler (1656 – May 19, 1713) was a member of the House of Representatives of the Colony of Connecticut from Norwalk in the sessions of October 1701, October 1703, May 1704, May 1706, May 1709 and October 1709. He is listed as a founding settler of Ridgefield, Connecticut on the founders monument in Ye Burying Ground cemetery in Ridgefield.

He was the son of Ralph Keeler and the brother of John Keeler.

On December 19, 1675, Samuel participated in the Narragansett Swamp Fight in Rhode Island during the King Philip's War. On account of his service, at a Norwalk town meeting on January 12, 1676, he was granted a parcel of land on Clapboard Hill.

In 1708, Samuel Keeler, father-in-law Matthias Sention, Sr., and Matthew St. John took part in the purchase of Ridgefield from the Indians for 100 pounds.

Notable descendants 
 Samuel is the third-great-grandfather of Edwin O. Keeler (1846–1923), Lieutenant Governor of Connecticut, and first mayor of Norwalk after its incorporation as a city.

References 

1656 births
1713 deaths
King Philip's War
Members of the Connecticut House of Representatives
People from Ridgefield, Connecticut
Politicians from Norwalk, Connecticut
Settlers of Connecticut